Irántxe (Irántxe, Iranxe, Iranshe) /iˈɻɑːntʃeɪ/, also known as Mỹky (Münkü) or still as Irántxe-Münkü, is an indigenous language spoken by the Irántxe (Iránxe, Iranche, Manoki, Munku) and Mỹky (Mynky, Münkü, Munku, Menku, Kenku, Myy) peoples in the state of Mato Grosso in Brazil. Recent descriptions of the language analyze it as a language isolate, in that it "bears no similarity with other language families" (Arruda 2003). Monserrat (2010) is a well-reviewed grammar of the language.

Vitality and dialects 
According to the UNESCO Atlas of the World's Languages in Danger, Irántxe-Mỹky is currently not thriving. While the Mỹky dialect is considered "vulnerable", the Irántxe variety is deemed "considerably endangered", with only 10 fluent speakers out of the 356 ethnic Irántxe-Mỹky in the 2006 report. As of 2011, the 280 Irántxe have largely assimilated to Brazilian culture. Most are monolingual in Portuguese, and the remaining Irántxe speakers are over 50 years old. A splinter group, the Mỹky, however, moved to escape assimilation, and were isolated until 1971. As of 2011, there were 80 ethnic Mỹky, all of whom spoke the language.

Dialects and location:
Irántxe dialect: spoken in Cravari village, on the Cravari River (a tributary of the Do Sangue River) in the municipality of Diamantino, Mato Grosso.
Mỹky dialect: spoken at an isolated village at the headwaters of the Escondido Creek, in the municipality of Brasnorte, Mato Grosso state.

Language contact
Jolkesky (2016) notes that there are lexical similarities with languages from the Arawak, Tupi, Chapakura-Wañam, Nambikwara, and Yanomami families, likely due to contact.

An automated computational analysis (ASJP 4) by Müller et al. (2013) also found lexical similarities between Irántxe-Mỹky and Nambikwaran.

Phonology
No instrumental phonetic data pertaining to the Irántxe-Mỹky language is available. The phonological description of Inrátxe-Mỹky is based on auditory analyses by the authors cited.

Consonants 
Irántxe-Mỹky has a small consonant inventory. Voicing is not contrastive for any consonant. In the Monserrat analysis shown in the table, there is a series of palatalized stops /pʲ tʲ kʲ/ and nasals /mʲ nʲ/, which reviewer D’Angelis (2011) analyzes as /Cj/ sequences. In Monserrat's analysis, /ʃ/ is a separate phoneme from /sʲ/.

Allophonic variation 

 The bilabial /m/ may occur as [mb] word initially, especially among the Irántxe: muhu [mbuhu], mjehy [mbʲɛhɨ]. 
 The sibilant /s/ is pronounced [ʃ] before /j/. 
 The trill /r/ may also occur as [l].
 The palatal approximant /j/ occurs as [ɲ] before nasal vowels.

Vowels 
The vowel inventory of Irántxe-Mỹky is large, with 21 phonemic vowels. Vowel length and nasalization are contrastive in the language. The role of tone is not clear.

In many words, /ə/ alternates with /ɛ/.

The maximal syllable shape may be CVC or CjVC word-medially, depending on the analysis. Word-finally, only CV ~ CʲV syllables occur.

Orthography 
The linguist Ruth Monserrat, along with native speaker Beth Jurusi, developed a system for spelling the Mỹky dialect.

Lexicon
Loukotka (1968) lists the following basic vocabulary items for the Irántxe dialect, later expanded in Holanda's (1960) larger vocabulary list. The Mỹky words derive from the dictionary compiled by Monserrat.

{| class="wikitable sortable"
! gloss !! Irántxe
!Mỹky
|-
| one|| yamachí
|kỹtapy
|-
| two|| numá
|numã
|-
| head|| pemã
|rem
|-
| tongue|| akirente
|jakirẽti
|-
|eye
|kutakecí
|kutakahy
|-
|nose
|kamínxí
|kjamĩhĩ
|-
| hand|| mimãchxi
|mimã
|-
| woman|| ekipu
|namy’i
|-
|man
|miʔá
|mía
|-
|old person
|naripú
|miptosohu
|-
| water|| manaː
|manã
|-
| maize|| kuratu
|kuratu
|-
|cassava
|mãinʔin
|mỹ’ĩ
|-
|fish
|miaxtapá
|miatapa
|-
| sun|| ileheː
|irehy
|-
|rain
|muhú
|muhu
|-
|day
|máʔá
|ma’a
|-
| white|| nakatá
|nakata
|}

References

Further reading

Meader, R. E. (1967). Iranxe: Notas Grammaticais e Lista Vocabular. (Publicações: Série Diversos Lingüística, 2.) Brasil: Museu Nacional, Universidade Federal do Rio de Janeiro.
Monserrat, R. F.; Amarante, E. R. (1995). Dicionário Mỹky-Português. Rio de Janeiro: Editora Sepeei/SR-5/UFRJ.
 Monserrat, Ruth. 2010. A língua do povo Mỹky. Campinas: Editora Curt Nimuendajú. 
 D’Angelis, Wilmar. 2011. Review of Monserrat (2010). LIAMES – Línguas Indígenas Ameríndias, vol 10.
 Anonby, Stan. 2009. A Report on the Irántxe and Myky.
 Fabre, Alain. 2005. Diccionario etnolingüístico y guía bibliográfica de los pueblos indígenas sudamericanos: .
 Arruda, Rinaldo. 2003. Iranxe Manoki. Instituto Socioambiental.
 Dixon & Alexandra Y. Aikhenvald (eds.), The Amazonian languages. Cambridge: Cambridge University Press, 1999. .
 

Languages of Brazil
Indigenous languages of South America
Endangered language isolates
Language isolates of South America
Mamoré–Guaporé linguistic area